Fransiskushjelpen is a Catholic charitable organisation in Norway, founded in by Brita Collett Paus in 1956.  Its administration headquarters are in Oslo, at St. Hallvard's Church and Monastery.

The organisation, connected to the Franciscan order, provide help to the seriously ill and dying people and to people in need, regardless of religious beliefs.

See also 
 Catholic Charities

External links 
  Fransiskushjelpen

Medical and health organisations based in Norway
Catholic charities
Health charities
Charities based in Norway
Catholicism in Norway
Christian organizations established in 1956
Order of Friars Minor